Prince Nugzar Petres dze Bagration-Gruzinsky (born  25 August 1950, in Tbilisi, Georgian Soviet Socialist Republic) is the head of the deposed royal House of Gruzinsky and represents its claim to the former crown of Georgia.

Biography
Prince Nugzar is the son of Prince Petre Bagration-Gruzinsky of Georgia (1920–1984), a prominent poet and claimant to the headship of the Georgian dynasty from 1939 until his death, and his second wife Liya Mgeladze (b. 8 August 1926). Prince Nugzar is the director of the Tbilisi theatre of cinema artists.

On 18 December 2007, Nugzar met with Kristiina Ojuland, the Vice-President of the Riigikogu (Parliament of Estonia) at the Marriott-Tbilisi Hotel in which Ojuland "paid homage to the Bagrationi dynasty, which has made an extraordinary contribution in support of Georgia".

Prince Nugzar is the senior descendant by primogeniture in the male line of George XII, the last King of Georgia (Kartli and Kakheti) to reign.

Family 
Nugzar married actress Leila Kipiani (b. Tbilisi 16 July 1947) on 10 February 1971, and they have two daughters:

Princess Ana Bagration-Gruzinsky, b. Tbilisi 1 November 1976. Married firstly to Grigoriy Malania and had two daughters with him, Irina and Mariam Bagration-Gruzinsky, and secondly, to Prince David Bagration of Mukhrani with whom she has a son, Prince Giorgi Bagrationi (see below).
Princess Maia Bagration-Gruzinsky, b. Tbilisi 2 January 1978. She married Nikolai Chichinadze and has two children with him, Themour and Ana Chichinadze.

As Nugzar has no male issue, Yevgeny Petrovich Gruzinsky (born 1947-died 17 July 2018), the great-great grandson of Bagrat's younger brother Ilia (1791–1854), who lived in the Russian Federation, was considered to be Nugzar's heir presumptive within the primogeniture principle. Yevgeny died without issue. Nugzar himself argues in favor of having his eldest daughter, Ana, designated as his heir in accordance with the Georgian dynastic law of "Zedsidzeoba" according to which every child of Princess Ana would inherit eligibility for dynastic succession through their mother, thus continuing the elder line of George XII.

Dynastic marriage of the Gruzinsky and Mukhrani heirs
Nugzar's daughter, Princess Ana, a divorced teacher and journalist with two daughters, married Prince David Bagration of Mukhrani, on 8 February 2009 at the Tbilisi Sameba Cathedral. The marriage united the Gruzinsky and Mukhrani branches of the Georgian royal family, and drew a crowd of 3,000 spectators, officials, and foreign diplomats, as well as extensive coverage by the Georgian media.

The dynastic significance of the wedding lay in the fact that, amidst the turmoil in political partisanship that has roiled Georgia since its independence in 1991, Patriarch Ilia II of Georgia publicly called for restoration of the monarchy as a path toward national unity in October 2007. Although this led some politicians and parties to entertain the notion of a Georgian constitutional monarchy, competition arose among the old dynasty's princes and supporters, as historians and jurists debated which Bagrationi has the strongest hereditary right to a throne that has been vacant for two centuries. Although some Georgian monarchists support the Gruzinsky branch's claim, others support that of the repatriated Mukhrani branch. Both branches descend in unbroken, legitimate male line from the medieval kings of Georgia down to Constantine II of Georgia who died in 1505.

Whereas the Bagration-Mukhrani were a cadet branch of the former Royal House of Kartli, they became the genealogically senior-most line of the Bagrationi family in the early 20th century: yet the elder branch had lost the rule of Kartli by 1724. Meanwhile, the Bagration-Gruzinsky line, although junior to the Princes of Mukhrani genealogically, reigned over the Kingdom of Kakheti, re-united the two realms in the kingdom of Kartli-Kakheti in 1762, and did not lose sovereignty until Russian annexation in 1801.

Prince Giorgi, the son of David and Ana, was born on 27 September 2011 in Madrid, Spain. Currently Nugzar does not officially recognize his grandson as heir to the Georgian throne. He continues to demand that David sign a written agreement in which he would recognize Nugzar and the Gruzinsky branch as the sole rightful heir to the Georgian throne and to the legacy of the Georgian kings.

Nevertheless, in 2013, Prince Giorgi returned to Georgia with his mother and father and was baptised by Patriarch Ilia II of Georgia at the cathedral in Mtskheta. This service was attended by Prince Nugzar, who after the christening of his grandson said:

Patronages 
  Director of Tiflis Theatre of Cinema Artists.

Honours

Dynastic honours
  House of Bagrationi: Sovereign Knight Grand Cross of the Royal Order of Saint Queen Ketevan the Martyr
  House of Bagrationi: Sovereign Knight Grand Cross of the Royal Order of Saint David
  House of Bagrationi: Sovereign Knight Grand Cross of the Royal Order of King Erekle II
  House of Bagrationi: Sovereign Knight Grand Cross with Collar of the Royal Order of the Crown of the Georgian Kingdom

Foreign honours
  Rwandan Royal Family: Knight Grand Cross with Collar of the Royal Order of the Drum

Ancestors
He is descendant of Marc Anthony

See also
Georgian monarchs family tree of Bagrationi dynasty

References

Sources

W.E.D. Allen, A History of the Georgian People, from the beginning down to the Russian conquest in the nineteenth century. Kegan Paul, Trench, Trubner & Co., Ltd., London, 1932.
Almanach de Gotha, annuaire généalogique, diplomatique et statistique. Justus Perthes, Gotha, 1826–1944.
I.L. Bichikashvili, D.V. Ninidze and A.N. Peikrishvili, The Genealogy of the Bagratides. Tiflis, 1995
M.L. Bierbrier, "The Descendants of Theodora Comnena of Trebizond". The Genealogist, Volumes 11, No. 2, Fall 1997 to 14, No. 1, Spring 2000 (inclusive). American Society of Genealogists, Picton Press, Rockport, ME.
M. Brosset (ed.), Rapporta sur un Voyage Archéologique dans la Géorgie et dans l'Arménie exécute en 1847–1848. L'académie Impériale des Sciences, St.- Pétersbourg, 1849 [British Library Shelfmark 1269.dd.10]
Marie-Félicité Brosset, Histoire de la Géorgie, depuis la'antiquité jusqu'au XIXe siècle, traduite du Géorgien. L'académie Impériale des Sciences, St.- Pétersbourg, 1856.
Marie-Félicité Brosset, "Inscriptions tumulaires géorgiennes de Moscou et de St.-Pètersbourg". Mémoires de l'Académie Impériale des Sciences de Saint-Pètersbourg. Sixième série. Sciences politiques, histoire et philologie. Tome IV. L'académie Impériale des Sciences, St.- Pétersbourg, 1840 pp. 461–521. [British Library shelfmark Ac. 1125/2]
Marie-Félicité Brosset, "Nouvelles rescherches sur l'histoire Wakhoucht, sur le roi Artchil et sa famille, et sur divers personages géorgiens enterrés à Moscou". Mélanges Asiatiques, Vol. III, l'Académie Impériale des Sciences, St Petersburg, 1859. pp. 534–575. [British Library shelfmark Ac. 1125/11]
Burke's Royal Families of the World, Volume II Africa & the Middle East, Burke's Peerage Ltd., London 1980.
Stanislav Dumin, "Tsars and Tsarevitchs of the United Kakheti and Kartli. T.S.H. Princes Gruzinsky", The Families of the Nobility of the Russian Empire, Volume III, Moscow, 1996.
Jacques Ferrand, Les Families Princieres de l'Ancien Empire de Russie en émigration. 3 parts. Montreuil, France, 1978.
Giorgi Gabeskiria. Georgian History. National Parliamentary Library of Georgia/Electronic Text Center, Tbilisi, 2001.
A. Gugushvili, "The Chronological-Genealogical Table of the Kings of Georgia". Georgica. Volume 1, Nos. 2 & 3, pp. 106–153. The Georgian Historical Society, London, October 1936.
János József Gudenus, Magyar családtorténeti adattár. Petófi Irodalmi Múzeum, Budapest. Internet, 2006.
Nicolas Ikonnikov, la Noblesse de Russie. Deuxième Edition. Paris, 1958.
Davit Marshal Lang, The Last Years of the Georgian Monarchy, 1658–1632. Columbia University Press, New York, 1957.
"Oukase Impérial réglant le titre et le raing des princes Géorgiens domiciliés en Russie". Journal Asiatique. Troisième série, Tome 1, Fevrier 1836, pp. 205–207. Société Asiatique, Paris, 1836.
S. Quakhchishvili (ed.), The Georgian Chronicle: the Period of Giorgi Lasha. Adolf M. Hakkert, Amsterdam, 1991.
Nino Salia, "le martyr de la reine Kéthévan de Georgie", Bedi Karthlisa "Le Destin de la Georgie", Revue de Karthvelologie, No 23 (N.S.), pp. 55–57, Paris, January 1957.
Kalistrat Salia and Katharine Vivian (trans.), History of the Georgian Nation. Paris, 1983.
Mihail-Dimitri Sturdza, Dictionnaire historique et génealgique des grandes familles de Grèce, d'Albanie et de Constantinople. Paris, 1999.
Cyril Toumanoff, "The Fifteenth-Century Bagratides and the Institution of Collegial Sovereignty in Georgia". Traditio. Volume VII, Fordham University Press, New York 1949–1951, pp. 169–221.
Cyrille Toumanoff, Manuel de généalogie et de chronologie pour l'histoire de la Caucasie Chrétienne (Arménie-Géorgie-Albanie). Edizioni Aquila, Roma, 1976.
Tsarévitch Wakhoucht (Prince Vakusht), Description géographique de la Géorgie. L'Académie Impérial des Sciences, St Pétersbourg, 1842.

External links 
 Official Site of the Royal House of Bagrationi of Georgia (Gruzinsky)

1950 births
Living people
Bagrationi dynasty of the Kingdom of Kartli-Kakheti
Georgian princes
Film people from Tbilisi
Theatre directors from Georgia (country)
Pretenders to the Georgian throne
Theatre people from Tbilisi